David Del Valle is a journalist, columnist, film historian, and radio and television commentator on horror, science-fiction, cult and fantasy films. Described by Entertainment Weekly as "Something of a cult celebrity himself," he was inducted into the Rondo Hatton Classic Horror Awards' Monster Kid Hall of Fame in 2016.

Early life
Del Valle began his love of horror movies early, beginning "when I was four, or five, or six years old. So the first movies I saw were the Universal horror films, with Lon Chaney Jr. as the Mummy, and Bela Lugosi as Dracula. And then I started watching the films of Vincent Price, especially at the drive-in, when I was in high school, because that’s what they showed, nothing but triple-feature horror movies. So as a kid, that was what I watched, as an escape from school…. And I’m sure my story resonates with a lot of people, because you start out with that genre when you’re a little boy. That’s the way that works."

Education
Del Valle attended San Francisco State University.

Career
Del Valle began contributing articles on horror and classic Hollywood movies to magazines including Video Watchdog, Cinefantastique, Scarlet Street, Diabolique, Kinoeye, Little Shoppe of Horrors, and the UK's Films and Filming, plus the website RealScreen.com. From 2000 to 2016, Del Valle wrote a web column on film history, Camp David, for the magazine Films in Review.

Del Valle additionally produced and hosted a series of cable TV interviews entitled Sinister Image. His guests included actor Cameron Mitchell and directors Russ Meyer and Curtis Harrington.  A compilation was released on home video as Cult People (1990), and the audio of Del Valle's 1987 Sinister Image on-camera interview with Vincent Price later appeared on the 2013 Shout Factory DVD/Blu-ray set The Vincent Price Collection. He also hosted and curated the Full Moon Features streaming series Haunted Hollywood in 2020. He was a producer and the onscreen interviewer of Vincent Price on the 1994 documentary Vincent Price: My Life and Crimes.

He began doing audio commentary on movie home video releases in 1983, and has continued to do them into the 2020s. (See "Audio commentary" below).

Del Valle curated the 2006 Los Angeles, California photo exhibit Nevermore, devoted to the Edgar Allan Poe films of Vincent Price and Roger Corman. Additionally, he has worked as a Hollywood talent agent, has done small, sometimes uncredited roles in low-budget films, and was casting director of the 1987 horror anthology film The Offspring aka From a Whisper to a Scream.

Audio commentary

He has contributed audio commentary to the DVD/Blu-ray releases of films including for the Criterion Collection:
 Connecting Rooms,
 The Count Yorga Collection (with C. Courtney Joyner)
 She Done Him Wrong, 
 The Web, 
Synapse Films:
 Suspiria,
Kino Lorber:
 The Amazing Transparent Man
 The Female Animal 
 The Perfect Furlough, 
Twilight Time:
 The Hound of the Baskervilles

Bibliography

Filmography

It Conquered Hollywood! The Story of American International Pictures (2001; interviewee; one-hour documentary for American Movie Classics (AMC)
"The Many Lives of Jason Voorhees" (2002; interviewee; half-hour documentary)
 Spine Tingler! The William Castle Story (2007; interviewee; feature documentary)

References

External links

The Del Valle Archives

American male journalists
American film historians
Film theorists
Living people
Year of birth missing (living people)